Jacob Shower (February 22, 1803 – May 25, 1879) was an American politician.

Born in Manchester, Maryland, Shower was a drummer in the War of 1812 and attended private schools at Emmitsburg, Maryland.  He graduated from the medical department of the University of Maryland at Baltimore in 1825 and commenced the practice of his profession in Carroll County, Maryland.

Shower was a charter member of the first Andrew Jackson Club in the State in 1824.  He was a Democratic member of the Maryland House of Delegates from 1834 to 1840, clerk of the circuit court of Carroll County from 1842 to 1850, and delegate to the State constitutional convention in 1851.  He was elected as a Democrat to the Thirty-third Congress, serving from March 4, 1853, to March 3, 1855.  After Congress, he resumed medical practice, and died in Manchester, Maryland.

References

1803 births
1879 deaths
People from Manchester, Maryland
Democratic Party members of the Maryland House of Delegates
Democratic Party members of the United States House of Representatives from Maryland
19th-century American politicians